Kampuchea Airlines was an airline based in Phnom Penh, Cambodia, operating regional passenger services out of Phnom Penh International Airport.

History
The airline became operational in 1997, then briefly known as SK Air. Kampuchea Airlines was shut down in 2004.

Fleet

Over the years, Kampuchea Airlines operated the following aircraft types:

Accidents and incidents
On February 25 1996, an Antonov An-24RV overran the runway at Ban Lung-Ratanakiri Airport causing the aircraft to crash into a building, all 42 occupants survived and there were no deaths on the ground.

References

External links

Defunct airlines of Cambodia
Airlines established in 1997
Airlines disestablished in 2004
Cambodian companies established in 1997